Cementite (or iron carbide) is a compound of iron and carbon, more precisely an intermediate transition metal carbide with the formula Fe3C. By weight, it is 6.67% carbon and 93.3% iron. It has an orthorhombic crystal structure. It is a hard, brittle material, normally classified as a ceramic in its pure form, and is a frequently found and important constituent in ferrous metallurgy. While cementite is present in most steels and cast irons, it is produced as a raw material in the iron carbide process, which belongs to the family of alternative ironmaking technologies. The name cementite originated from the theory of Floris Osmond and J. Werth, in which the structure of solidified steel consists of a kind of cellular tissue, with ferrite as the nucleus and Fe3C the envelope of the cells. The carbide therefore cemented the iron.

Metallurgy

In the iron–carbon system (i.e. plain-carbon steels and cast irons) it is a common constituent because ferrite can contain at most 0.02wt% of uncombined carbon. Therefore, in carbon steels and cast irons that are slowly cooled, a portion of the carbon is in the form of cementite. Cementite forms directly from the melt in the case of white cast iron. In carbon steel, cementite precipitates from austenite as austenite transforms to ferrite on slow cooling, or from martensite during tempering. An intimate mixture with ferrite, the other product of austenite, forms a lamellar structure called pearlite.

While cementite is thermodynamically unstable, eventually being converted to austenite (low carbon level) and graphite (high carbon level) at higher temperatures, it does not decompose on heating at temperatures below the eutectoid temperature (723 °C) on the metastable iron-carbon phase diagram.

Mechanical properties are as follows: room temperature microhardness 760–1350 HV; bending strength 4.6–8 GPa, Young's modulus 160–180 GPa, indentation fracture toughness 1.5–2.7 MPa√m.

Pure form

A natural iron carbide (containing minor amounts of nickel and cobalt) occurs in iron meteorites and is called cohenite after the German mineralogist Emil Cohen, who first described it.

Other iron carbides
There are other forms of metastable iron carbides that have been identified in tempered steel and in the industrial Fischer–Tropsch process. These include epsilon (ε) carbide, hexagonal close-packed Fe2–3C, precipitates in plain-carbon steels of carbon content > 0.2%, tempered at 100–200 °C. Non-stoichiometric ε-carbide dissolves above ~200 °C, where Hägg carbides and cementite begin to form. Hägg carbide, monoclinic Fe5C2, precipitates in hardened tool steels tempered at 200–300 °C. It has also been found naturally as the mineral Edscottite in the Wedderburn meteorite

References

Bibliography

External links

 Crystal structure of cementite at NRL
  
 
 

Iron compounds
Carbides
Metallurgy
Iron